Malaga Soulaimana (born 5 April 1989) is a Comorian professional footballer who plays as a defender for the Comorian club Fomboni FC.

Soulaimana made his international debut for the Comoros national football team in a 2018 African Nations Championship qualification 2-0 win over Lesotho on 15 July 2017.

International career

International goals
Scores and results list the Comoros' goal tally first.

References

External links
 
 NFT Profile
 Comoros Football Profile

1989 births
Living people
Comorian footballers
Comoros international footballers
Association football defenders